Riviera is an Italian word which means "coastline", ultimately derived from Latin , through Ligurian . It came to be applied as a proper name to the coast of Liguria, in the form Riviera ligure, then shortened in English. The two areas currently known in English as "the Riviera" without additional qualification are:
 the French Riviera, the southeastern coast of France
 the Italian Riviera, the adjacent northwestern coast of Italy

Riviera may also refer to:

Africa
Red Sea Riviera, the eastern shore of Egypt

America

Mexico
Riviera Maya, the Caribbean coast of the Yucatán Peninsula
Mexican Riviera, the southwestern coast of Mexico, including Acapulco
Riviera Nayarit, another part of Pacific coast of Mexico

United States
 California Riviera, Santa Barbara, California
 Florida Riviera, Fort Lauderdale, Florida
 Florida Riviera, Sunny Isles Beach, Florida
 Irish Riviera, Scituate, Massachusetts

Asia 
Chinese Riviera, coastal region in Zhuhai, China
Turkish Riviera, also known as the Turquoise Coast

Europe

Western
 English Riviera, Torbay 
 Thames Riviera, an area of London, United Kingdom that includes Tagg's Island
 French Riviera, also known as the Côte d'Azur
 Italian Riviera, also known as the Riviera Ligure
 Portuguese Riviera, also known as the Costa do Estoril
 Swiss Riviera, on Lake Geneva, also known as Riviera vaudoise

Eastern
 Bulgarian Black Sea Coast, also known as the Bulgarian Riviera, formerly part of the Red Riviera.
 Caucasian Riviera, of Russia and Georgia
 Jurmala near Riga in Latvia, once known as the Baltic Riviera

Southern
 Albanian Riviera
 Athens Riviera, the Saronic Gulf coastline of Athens
 Budva Riviera, in Montenegro
 Makarska Riviera, in Croatia
 Slovene Riviera

Former
 Austrian Riviera, former term used for the coastline of the defunct Austrian Empire

References

Italian words and phrases
Coasts